Addition Elle was a Canadian clothing store chain that sold plus-size clothing. It was established in Montreal and sold to Reitmans in 2001.  It closed all 74 Canadian locations Aug 15, 2021.  Addition Elle clothing line can now be found at sister store, Penningtons.

Summary
The name of the store (not affiliated with Elle magazine) is a pun on the French word additionelle, which translates to additional in English. The company was established in Montreal in 1980, and sold to Reitmans in 2001.<ref name='reitman"></ref> Addition Elle had 139 locations across Canada. All clothing comes in at least a ladies' size 14 and goes up to size 26. The target demographic of the store is full figured women between 18 and 49 years of age. Some stores also sell bras and other lingerie items. Prior to the restructuring of Reitmans Ltd and the closing of all stores in Canada, Addition Elle stores were usually located in shopping malls, but a few were standalone big box stores.

Sportswear, career apparel, and casual designs are the basic staples of all Addition Elle franchises.

Jessica Biffi, who was a former contestant on the reality show Project Runway Canada, designed a collection of clothing for Addition Elle for the spring 2010 fashion season.

References

External links

1980 establishments in Quebec
Clothing retailers of Canada
Companies based in Montreal
Retail companies established in 1980
2001 mergers and acquisitions